Live at the Basement is the third live album by Australian musician Renée Geyer. The album was recorded in May 1986 and released by Mushroom Records.

The album was recorded as Geyer's Australian 'farewell', as she boarded a plane to the United States within 12 hours of recording the album.

At the ARIA Music Awards of 1987, the album earned Geyer a nomination for ARIA Award for Best Female Artist, losing out to Jenny Morris.

Track listing
Vinyl/ cassette (L 38593)

Side one
 "Sitting On the Dock of the Bay" (Otis Redding, Steve Cropper) - 5:04
 "Baby, I've Been Missing You" (Chuck Jackson, Marvin Yancy) (4:20)
 "I've Got You, I Feel Good" (James Brown) - 4:51
 "It's a Man's, Man's, Man's World" (Betty Newsome, James Brown) - 7:11

Side two
 "Peace and Understanding Is Hard to Find" (Autry DeWalt, Ronald Harville) - 5:40
 "Who Was That Girl" (Al Saxon, Dave Carey) - 5:48
 "If You Leave Me, I'll Go Crazy" (James Brown) - 3:22
 "Release Yourself" (Marc Jordan) - 8:02

Personnel
 Renée Geyer – vocals
 Mark Williams – backing vocals
 Andy Thompson – saxophone
 Harry Brus – bass
 John Watson – drums
 Steve Housden – guitar
 Jamie McKinley – keyboards
 Andy Thompson – saxophone
 Geoff Oakes – saxophone
 Mike Bukovsky – trumpet

References

Renée Geyer albums
Pop rock albums by Australian artists
1986 live albums
Live albums by Australian artists
Mushroom Records live albums